Theodore Kaufmann (December 18, 1814 – 1896) was an artist who worked mostly in the United States.

Biography
He was born in Uelzen, Germany. He served for several years as a mercantile apprentice. He studied painting in Düsseldorf with Peter von Cornelius, in Munich with Wilhelm von Kaulbach, and also in Hamburg and Dresden. He took part in the revolution at Dresden in 1848, and emigrated to the United States in 1850. He settled in New York City, where he painted portraits and taught. One of his students was editorial artist Thomas Nast. He was not successful as a school director or painter in New York, and became an itinerant photographer and portrait painter.

During the American Civil War, he is reported to have fought in the Union Army and to have been a correspondent-artist. St. Louis, Missouri, city directories list him as an artist in 1864 and 1865. After the Civil War, he resided in Boston and Washington, D.C. Louis Prang made color lithographs of some of Kaufmann's more popular pieces. Kaufmann is noted for his portraits and military and historical paintings. He died in New York City.

Works
 "Gen. Sherman near the Watchfire"
 "On to Liberty"
 "A Pacific Railway Train attacked by Indians"
 "Slaves seeking Shelter under the Flag of the Union"
 "Admiral Farragut entering Harbor through Torpedoes"
 "Farragut in the Rigging"
 "Westward the Star of Empire" (c. 1880)
 "Die Entstehung der Gottesidee" ("The development of the idea of God"; a series of eight etchings which, along with explanatory text, are in the Library of Congress)

Notes

References
 Biography at University of Missouri - St. Louis website
 Biographical data at Smithsonian American Art Museum website

Attribution

External links
 

1814 births
1896 deaths
People from Uelzen
19th-century American painters
American male painters
People of the American Civil War
German-American Forty-Eighters
Union Army soldiers
19th-century American male artists